According to the USGS GNIS, the state of Washington in the United States has 10 peaks named Granite Mountain:

Mountains of Washington (state)